Jennifer Diane LaPonte (born July 3, 1990) is an American soccer defender who played for the Houston Dash.

Early life 
She was born in Castro Valley, California. She grew up playing for Mustang Fury-based out of Danville, California. She attended Santa Clara University, where she was a four-year letterwinner.

Club career 
She had played previously for Seattle Reign FC, Sky Blue FC, Portland Thorns FC and the Boston Breakers but did not make any appearances. On August 7, 2015, she signed with Houston Dash. She was released by the Dash in April 2016.

International career 
She was called up into the United States youth national teams, playing for the United States U14 all the way to the United States U23. She currently plays for the Puerto Rican women's national team.

Honours 
Seattle Reign
Runner-up
 National Women's Soccer League: 2014

References

External links 
 
 Houston Dash player profile

1989 births
Women's association football defenders
Houston Dash players
Living people
National Women's Soccer League players
Soccer players from California
Portland Thorns FC players
NJ/NY Gotham FC players
American women's soccer players
People from Castro Valley, California
Sportspeople from Castro Valley, California
Santa Clara Broncos women's soccer players